The 1946 North Carolina Tar Heels football team was an American football team that represented the University of North Carolina in the Southern Conference during the 1946 college football season. In their fourth year under head coach Carl Snavely, the Tar Heels compiled an 8–2–1 record (4–0–1 against Southern Conference opponents), won the conference title, and outscored opponents by a total of 271 to 129. They ranked ninth in the final AP Poll and were invited to the school's first bowl game, the 1947 Sugar Bowl, which they lost to Georgia.

The Tar Heels ranked seventh nationally in rushing with an average of 234.1 yards per game. The rushing attack was led by Charlie Justice who ranked third nationally with 943 rushing yards and averaged 7.20 yards per carry. Justice was inducted into the College Football Hall of Fame in 1961.

Five North Carolina players were honored by the Associated Press (AP) on the 1946 All-Southern Conference football team: Justice on the first team; tackle Ted Hazelwood and center Chan Highsmith on the second team; and guard Harry Varney and fullback Hosea Rodgers (third team).

The team played its home games at Kenan Memorial Stadium.

Schedule

After the season

The 1947 NFL Draft was held on December 16, 1946. The following Tar Heels were selected.

References

North Carolina
North Carolina Tar Heels football seasons
Southern Conference football champion seasons
North Carolina Tar Heels football